Urpo Yrjö Juhani Ylönen (born 25 May 1943 in Käkisalmi, Finland) is a goaltending coach and a retired professional ice hockey player who played in the SM-liiga. He played for TuTo and TPS. He was inducted into the Finnish Hockey Hall of Fame in 1988 and to the IIHF Hall of Fame in 1997. SM-liiga has named the goalie of the year award after him; the Urpo Ylönen trophy.

After his sporting career, Ylönen has made a renowned career as the head goaltending coach of TPS. Many European experts have called Ylönen "the best goaltending coach in Europe, if not in the world". Ylönen has been producing top level goalies year after year, including Miikka Kiprusoff, Fredrik Norrena, Antero Niittymäki, Jani Hurme, Alexander Salak and Ari Sulander.

External links
Finnish Hockey Hall of Fame page

1943 births
Living people
People from Priozersk
Finnish ice hockey goaltenders
Ice hockey players at the 1968 Winter Olympics
Ice hockey players at the 1976 Winter Olympics
IIHF Hall of Fame inductees
Olympic ice hockey players of Finland
HC TPS players
TuTo players